Decimus Junius Silanus (107 – after 62 BC) was a consul of the Roman Republic. He may have been the son of Marcus Junius Silanus, consul in 109 BC. He was the stepfather of Marcus Junius Brutus, having married Brutus' mother, Servilia.

Biography

Early life
Born in 107 BC, Decimus Junius M. f. D. n. Silanus was the son of a Marcus Junius Silanus, presumably Decimus had an elder brother named Marcus, but he might have died young.

Marriage
Silanus married Servilia, after her first husband died. Together they had four children, a son, Marcus Junius Silanus, and three daughters, Junia Prima, Junia Secunda, and Junia Tertia. Silanus may also have been the father of a Decimus Junius Silanus.

Political career
He was aedile in 70 BC, but he lost the election to be a consul of 63.  He was successful the following year, and so in consequence of his being consul designatus was first asked for his opinion by Cicero in the debate in the senate on the punishment of the Catilinarian conspirators. At first he spoke in favor of "the supreme penalty" for the conspirators, but when Julius Caesar suggested life imprisonment, Silanus insisted that was what he had really meant. As such, it was left to Cato the Younger to force through the decision to actually execute them.

He was consul in 62 with Lucius Licinius Murena. They proposed the lex Junia Licinia, which provided that a rogatio (a proposed law) must be promulgated three nundinae, or market-intervals, before the people voted on it. It also confirmed the lex Caecilia Didia.

Family

Footnotes

References

Appian, Bellum Civilum, ii.5.
Cicero, de Officiis, ii.57; ad Atticum, i.1, ii.9, iv.16, xii.21.7; in Catilinam, iv.4; pro Sestio, 64; in Vatinum, 14; Philippics, ii.5.
Cicero, The correspondence of M. Tullius Cicero, Volume 1, Edition 2 1885 (Google Books)
Pliny the Elder, Naturalis Historia, ii.35.
Plutarch, Cicero, 20, 21; Cato Minor, 22.
Sallust, Bellum Catilinae, 50.
Suetonius, Caesar, 14.

100s BC births
1st-century BC deaths
1st-century BC Roman consuls
Decimus
Family of Servilia (mother of Brutus)
Senators of the Roman Republic